CSX Transportation's Brooksville Subdivision is a railroad line in the Tampa Bay region of Florida. Today, the line runs from the Clearwater Subdivision in Sulphur Springs, Florida north to a point just north of Brooksville, a distance of 49.1 miles.  Historically, the Brooksville Subdivision was owned and operated by CSX predecessor, the Seaboard Air Line Railroad.  Under Seaboard ownership, the Brooksville Subdivision continued north as far as Waldo, where it intercepted the Seaboard Air Line main line (which is now CSX's S Line).

Currently, the Brooksville Subdivision notably serves a Florida Crushed Stone Company facility in Brooksville along with a Cemex facility.

History

Sulphur Springs to Brooksville

The line from Brooksville south to Fivay Junction (near the present-day intersection of US 41 and SR 52)  was originally built by the Brooksville and Hudson Railroad in 1902.  The Brooksville and Hudson Railroad was a logging railroad owned by the Aripeka Sawmills Inc. 

In 1907, the Brooksville and Hudson Railroad was bought by the Tampa Northern Railroad.  The Tampa Northern then built track from Tampa to Fivay and rebuilt the Brooksville and Hudson Railroad from there to Brooksville.  The line was completed in 1908.  The Tampa Northern Railroad was bought by the Seaboard Air Line Railroad in 1912.

Brooksville to Waldo

At its greatest extent, the Brooksville Subdivision extended as far north as Waldo.  Track from Waldo to Archer was built in 1861 by the Florida Railroad (later the Florida Central and Peninsular Railroad) which also continued from Archer to Cedar Key at the time.  In 1890, track was built from Archer south to Early Bird.  The Seaboard Air Line bought the FC&P network in 1900 and in 1911, the line was extended south of Early Bird to Inverness.  The extension from Early Bird to Inverness ran closely parallel the Atlantic Coast Line Railroad's High Springs–Lakeland Line.  

In 1925, the Brooksville and Inverness Railway, a Seaboard subsidiary, was built connecting Inverness with the former Tampa Northern Railroad in Brooksville.  This would create an additional freight route from northern Florida to the Tampa Bay region as an alternative to the Seaboard main line.  Around the same time, track from Inverness to Waldo was upgraded with heavier rail, and the Seaboard main line was double-tracked from Waldo north to Baldwin which further increased capacity.    After track from Archer to Cedar Key was abandoned in 1932, the full line from Waldo to Sulpher Springs was designated as the Brooksville Subdivision.  By 1940, the Seaboard was running a daily through freight train round-trip on the line.

Later years
The Seaboard Air Line became the Seaboard Coast Line Railroad in 1967 after merging with their former rival, the Atlantic Coast Line Railroad.  In the combined network, the full line was largely redundant due to the Atlantic Coast Line Railroad's nearly parallel route as well as its own main line to Tampa.  The Seaboard Coast Line abandoned the Brooksville Subdivision between Waldo and Brooksville in the 1970s (which nearly restored the Tampa Northern Railroad's original terminus ironically).  The line now ends near the Broco Quarry just north of Brooksville.  Despite the abandonment, the line's SR mileposts numbers remain as they did when the full line was intact.

In 1980, the Seaboard Coast Line's parent company merged with the Chessie System, creating the CSX Corporation.  The CSX Corporation initially operated the Chessie and Seaboard Systems separately until 1986, when they were merged into CSX Transportation.

Historic Seaboard Air Line stations

See also
 List of CSX Transportation lines
 Main Line (Seaboard Air Line Railroad)
 Clearwater Subdivision

References

CSX Transportation lines
Seaboard Air Line Railroad
Railway lines opened in 1902
Rail infrastructure in Florida